"Garden Party (The Great Cucumber Massacre)" is a song by the British neo-progressive rock band Marillion. It was the second single released from their debut album Script for a Jester's Tear. It reached number 16 in the UK Singles Chart in 1983, the band's biggest singles chart success prior to 1985. The song is a parody of social elitism and snobbery. The B-side is a live version of "Margaret" (recorded at Edinburgh Playhouse, 7 April 1983). The 12" single includes a live version of "Charting The Single" (recorded at Hammersmith Odeon, 18 April 1983).

A CD replica of the single was also part of a collectors box-set released in July 2000 which contained Marillion's first twelve singles and was re-issued as a 3-CD set in 2009 (see The Singles '82-'88).

Track listing

7" Versions

Side A
 "Garden Party" [Edited version] – 04:29

Side B
"Margaret" [Edited live version, Edinburgh Playhouse, 7 April 1983] – 04:09

12" Versions

Side A
 "Garden Party" [Full version] – 07:11
 "Charting the Single" [Live version, London Hammersmith Odeon, 18 April 1983] – 06:30

Side B
"Margaret" [Full live version, Edinburgh Playhouse, 7 April 1983] – 12:17

Controversy
After the synth/guitar break in the middle of the song, a verse starts:

I'm puntingI'm beaglingI'm winingRecliningI'm ruckingI'm miming(So welcome) It's a party!

The original lyrics read "I'm fucking", replaced by "I'm miming" in the shorter radio-friendly 7" single release. "Rucking" in the previous line is a rugby term; the sport is referred to earlier in the song. Fish appeared on shows such as Top of the Pops, the UK's long running chart show and, at the point where he ought to be singing the broadcastable "miming", he shut his mouth and merely pointed at his lips as the words came over the PA. The album version (which was also included on the 12" release) contained the original lyric.

Personnel
Fish – vocals
Steve Rothery - guitars
Mark Kelly - keyboards
Pete Trewavas - bass
Mick Pointer - drums

References

External links
Garden Party lyrics explained
Music video on YouTube

1983 singles
Marillion songs
Songs written by Steve Rothery
Songs written by Fish (singer)
Songs written by Mark Kelly (keyboardist)
Songs written by Ian Mosley
Songs written by Pete Trewavas